Maria Roser Serra Carandell (born 30 August 1971) is a Spanish former international football goalkeeper.

Serra represented Spain at senior international level. During qualifying for UEFA Women's Euro 1997, she kept goal in a 1–1 draw in Sweden as well as in an 8–0 home defeat in the return fixture. In September 1996 Serra was Player of the Match as Spain eliminated England in the play–off. She was selected for the final tournament and played in Spain's 2–1 defeat to Italy in the semi–final. Serra collected a total of 33 caps.

On the club level Serra spent a period playing semi–professionally with Arsenal in London, before returning to Barcelona.

References

Spanish women's footballers
1971 births
Living people
Spain women's international footballers
Footballers from Catalonia
Arsenal W.F.C. players
FA Women's National League players
People from Barcelona
Primera División (women) players
FC Barcelona Femení players
Women's association football goalkeepers